Carl Viktor Gaddefors (born October 8, 1992) is a Swedish professional basketball player for Donar of the BNXT League.

Career

Sidigas Avellino acquired Gaddefors in October 2011. Gaddefors played for Virtus Bologna in 2012 to 2014. He joined Pallacanestro Mantovana in October 2014. After playing for Juve Caserta, Gaddefors signed with the Antibes Sharks in March 2018 to replace the injured Paul Rigot and Max Kouguere. He averaged 7.2 points, 4.3 rebounds, 1.9 assists and 1.3 steals per game during the 2019-20 season.

Gaddefors signed with Södertälje BBK on September 25, 2020. He won the Swedish Basketball League MVP Award of the 2020–21 season. Gaddefors averaged 20.3 points, 9.8 rebounds, 2.6 assists and On September 13, 2021, he signed with CS Dinamo București of the Liga Națională.

On November 11, 2022, he signed with Donar of the BNXT League.

References

External links

 RealGM profile

1992 births
Living people
Juvecaserta Basket players
Lega Basket Serie A players
Olympique Antibes basketball players
Pallacanestro Mantovana players
People from Östersund
S.S. Felice Scandone players
Södertälje Kings players
Small forwards
Sportspeople from Jämtland County
Swedish expatriate basketball people in France
Swedish expatriate basketball people in Italy
Swedish men's basketball players
Uppsala Basket players
Virtus Bologna players